Ali Khencheli or Mahmoud Djellal (born at Khenchela) is an Algerian musician of Berber origin. He sang from 1940 to 1960. He died at 88 years.

References

Sources
New Soir and Djazairess
 biography 
  book google short biography in English
Auresienne Kahina

Berber Algerians
Berber musicians
Chaoui people
Year of birth missing
Year of death missing